The 1960 Star World Championships were held in Rio de Janeiro, Brazil in 1960.

Results

References

Star World Championships
1960 in sailing
Sailing competitions in Brazil